Terna S.p.A. is a transmission system operator (TSO) based in Rome, Italy. It operates through Terna Rete Italia, that manages the Italian transmission grid and Terna Plus which is in charge of new business opportunities and non-traditional activities in Brazil, Uruguay, Peru and Chile (2021). With  of power lines or around 98% of the Italian high-voltage power transmission grid, Terna is the sixth largest electricity transmission grid operator in the world based on the size of its electrical grid. Terna is listed on the Borsa Italiana and is a constituent of the FTSE MIB index.

History
On 31 May 1999, Terna was established within the Enel Group, by way of implementation of Italian Legislative Decree No. 79/99 which within the context of the process for the deregulation of the Italian electricity sector, sanctioned the separation between ownership and management of the national transmission grid.

On 23 June 2004, following the Prime Minister's Decree issued on 11 May of the same year, Terna was put on sale with an IPO on Borsa Italiana.

In 2010 Terna joined Desertec, a project aimed at producing and transmitting renewable energy in the Middle East and North Africa (MENA) to meet local needs and be assigned in part to the European interconnected grid.

In 2011, Terna Group adopted a new organizational structure. Through Terna Rete Italia safely manages the Italian electricity system with more than 63,500 kilometers of high voltage lines. Through Terna Plus manages new business opportunities and non-traditional activities, in Italy and abroad.

2011 was the 7th consecutive year of growth for the Group. A dividend of €21 was paid per share.
The 2011 results were submitted by the CEO Flavio Cattaneo during the Terna Board of Administration meeting held to approve the Strategic Plan 2012–2016.

In 2012, Terna consolidated Revenues stood at 1,806 million euros, +10.4% compared to 2011, mainly due to the Grid Transmission Fee and to the results from Non Traditional Activities carried out by the Group.

On 31 January 2012, Terna presented the Development Plan of the National Electricity Transmission Grid for the decade 2012–2021. The plan is drafted and updated every year and, in 2012, it included investments for over 7 billion euro aimed at increasing efficiency for the electricity system, including the reduction of energy losses and the reduction of  emissions.

In 2013, Terna consolidated Revenues stood at 1,896 million euros, with an increase of 90.5 million euros (+5%) compared to 2012. Ebitda stood at 1,281 million euros (+6,5%), Group Net income at 514 million euro (+10,8%).

Operations

Terna is responsible for national electricity transmission management and development in Italy.
Terna's assets include:
74,855 km of lines 
896 transformation and switching stations 
1 National Control Center (NCC)
3 Control centers 
26 lines of interconnections with other countries (CTI) 
SA.PE.I. the longest underwater cable in the world (435 km), with a capacity of 1000 MW 
To safeguard its assets, Terna has created an organization capable of protecting the company's physical and technological infrastructures, also through the prevention and management of episodes of corporate fraud. In this framework, in order to guarantee the maximum safeguarding of said infrastructures and investments, it has signed memoranda of understanding, first of its kind and type with the Ministry of the Interior, Carabinieri and Guardia di Finanza.

In 2010 the company invested €1.06 billion that financed the construction of 1000 km of new electrical lines and 48 new stations.
Terna's transmission lines carried 326.16 billion kWh in 2010, of which:
286.53 billion generated by power plants in Italy 
45.76 billion imported 
1.81 billion exported
4.31 billion for pumping stations

In turn, 286.53 billion kWh were generated by:
Thermoelectric power plants: 218.35 billion
Hydroelectric power plants: 53.16 billion
Wind power plants: 8.37 billion
Geothermal power plants: 5.03 billion
Photovoltaic power plants: 1.6 billion

Board of directors
Board members:
Valentina Bosetti - Chairwoman
Stefano Antonio Donnarumma - chief executive officer and General Manager
Alessandra Faella
Yunpeng He
Valentina Canalini
Ernesto Carbone
Giuseppe Ferri
Antonella Baldino
Fabio Corsico
Marco Giorgino
Gabriella Porcelli 
Paola Giannotti
Jean-Michel Aubertin

Shareholders
Terna has been listed in the Italian Stock Exchange since 2004. Its major shareholder was Cassa Depositi e Prestiti, with 29.85% of shares. The remaining nearly 70% is held by other institutional and retail investors.
Among  the principal shareholders of the company: Romano Minozzi with 5.6%, Blackrock Inc. with 2.4% and Assicurazioni Generali with 2.0%.

Awards
According to the Edison Electric Institute, Terna is the best European company among utilities by total return of shares in 2010–2012. In these three years Terna's return stood at 24%, compared to average returns in the sector (DJ Stoxx-10%, Ftse Mib-21%). In 2010 Terna did receive the same recognition for the 2007–2009, as Terna's share return stood at +40%, achieving a net overperfomance (nearly 55%) compared to the European sector that registered -15%.

References

External links
ENTSO-E Transmission System Operators
Corriere Economia http://rassegnastampa.mef.gov.it/mefeconomica/View.aspx?ID=2010051715717598-1

Electric power transmission system operators in Italy
Companies based in Rome
Companies listed on the Borsa Italiana
Former Enel subsidiaries
Formerly government-owned companies of Italy